The 2019 South Florida Bulls football team represented the University of South Florida (USF) during the 2019 NCAA Division I FBS football season. The Bulls were led by third-year head coach Charlie Strong and played their home games at Raymond James Stadium in Tampa, Florida. They competed as members of the East Division of the American Athletic Conference. They finished the season 4–8, 2–6 in AAC play to finish in fourth place in the East Division. 

On December 2, head coach Charlie Strong was fired. He finished at South Florida with a three-year record of 21–16.

Previous season

In 2018, South Florida began the year with seven consecutive victories, but lost their remaining six games, becoming the first team in FBS history to do so. This was achieved after a loss to Marshall in the Gasparilla Bowl.

Preseason

Coaching changes
In January 2019, South Florida hired Kerwin Bell as their new offensive coordinator, replacing Sterlin Gilbert, who left to take the head coaching job at McNeese State. Bell had spent the previous three seasons as the head coach at Valdosta State, where he led the school to an NCAA Division II national title in 2018.

AAC media poll
The AAC media poll was released on July 16, 2019, with the Bulls predicted to finish third in the AAC East Division.

Pre-season award watch lists
Heading into the 2019 season, five Bulls were named to various award watch lists: Blake Barnett (Johnny Unitas Golden Arm Award), Coby Weiss (Lou Groza Award), Marcus Norman (Outland Trophy), Mike Hampton (Jim Thorpe Award), and Mitchell Wilcox (John Mackey Award).

Schedule
South Florida's 2019 schedule will begin with three non-conference games: at home against Wisconsin of the Big Ten Conference, then on the road against Georgia Tech of the Atlantic Coast Conference (ACC), and then at home again against South Carolina State of the Mid-Eastern Athletic Conference (MEAC). Their fourth non-conference game will be played at home against BYU, a football independent, after the start of the conference schedule. In American Athletic Conference play, the Bulls will play the other members of the East Division and draw Memphis, Navy, and SMU from the West Division. They will not play Houston, Tulane, or Tulsa as part of the regular season.

Source:

Game summaries

Wisconsin

at Georgia Tech

South Carolina State

SMU

at UConn

BYU

at Navy

at East Carolina

Temple

Cincinnati

Memphis

at UCF

References

South Florida
South Florida Bulls football seasons
South Florida Bulls football